Neocalyptis angustilineata is a species of moth of the  family Tortricidae. It is found in Japan, the Russian Far East and on the Korean Peninsula.

The wingspan is 12.5–16 mm.

References

	

Moths described in 1900
Neocalyptis